Iliya Hristov Gruev (born 30 October 1969) is a Bulgarian retired professional footballer. Until 2022 he was assistant manager at Arminia Bielefeld.

Playing career
Gruev has played for Levski, Lokomotiv Sofia and Montana. After that he moved to Neftochimic Burgas where he played for almost five years, before leaving for Germany to represent MSV Duisburg from 2000 to 2004. Following that he played for KFC Uerdingen 05 before finishing his active career in Rot-Weiß Erfurt.

Gruev has 13 caps for Bulgaria, scoring once – on 11 October 1997, in the 2–4 away loss in a 1998 World Cup qualifier against Russia.

Managerial career

Assistant manager
He was assistant coach in Chernomorets Burgas, Hajduk Split, Duisburg, 1. FC Kaiserslautern and Bulgaria from 2009 to 2015.

MSV Duisburg
After MSV Duisburg's bad results and following the release of their manager Gino Lettieri, Gruev was announced as the new manager of the team, signing a contract until 2017, becoming a first team manager for the first time. In the 2016–17 season, Duisburg won the 3. Liga and got promoted to the 2. Bundesliga.

Gruev was sacked on 1 October 2018 after the team scored only two points out of the first eight matches. Torsten Lieberknecht became the new head coach.

Werder Bremen
In summer 2019, Gruev joined Werder Bremen as an assistant coach with a focus on set pieces.

Personal life
Gruev's son Ilia is also a professional footballer for Werder Bremen.

Career statistics

International goal
Scores and results list Bulgaria's goal tally first, score column indicates score after each Gruev goal.

Managerial statistics

References

External links

Profile at LevskiSofia.info

Living people
1969 births
Footballers from Sofia
Association football midfielders
Bulgarian footballers
Bulgaria international footballers
PFC Levski Sofia players
PFC Slavia Sofia players
FC Lokomotiv 1929 Sofia players
Neftochimic Burgas players
Altay S.K. footballers
MSV Duisburg managers
MSV Duisburg players
First Professional Football League (Bulgaria) players
2. Bundesliga players
Bulgarian football managers
HNK Hajduk Split non-playing staff
2. Bundesliga managers
3. Liga managers
Bulgarian expatriate footballers
Bulgarian expatriate football managers
Bulgarian expatriate sportspeople in Germany
Expatriate footballers in Germany
Expatriate football managers in Germany
Bulgarian expatriate sportspeople in Turkey
Expatriate footballers in Turkey
SV Werder Bremen non-playing staff